Bridge in City of Wilkes-Barre is a historic stone arch bridge spanning Mill Creek in Wilkes-Barre, Luzerne County, Pennsylvania. It is a  bridge with a single  span. It was listed on the National Register of Historic Places in 1988.

See also
List of bridges documented by the Historic American Engineering Record in Pennsylvania

References

External links

Road bridges on the National Register of Historic Places in Pennsylvania
Bridges in Luzerne County, Pennsylvania
Historic American Engineering Record in Pennsylvania
National Register of Historic Places in Luzerne County, Pennsylvania
Wilkes-Barre, Pennsylvania
Stone arch bridges in the United States